Ramadhar Kashyap (6 February 1964 – 6 July 2021) was a politician from the Indian National Congress party. He served as member of the Parliament of India representing Chhattisgarh in the Rajya Sabha, the upper house of the Indian Parliament, from 2002 until 2008.

References

External links
   Rajya Sabha members from Chhattisgarh

1964 births
2021 deaths
Indian National Congress politicians
Rajya Sabha members from Chhattisgarh